Solyanka is a rural locality (a selo) and the administrative center of Solyansky Selsoviet, Narimanovsky District, Astrakhan Oblast, Russia. The population was 3,738 as of 2010. There are 124 streets.

Geography 
It is located on the Volga River, 37 km south of Narimanov (the district's administrative centre) by road. Solyanka is the nearest rural locality.

References 

Rural localities in Narimanovsky District